Viscachayoc or Wisk'achayuq (Quechua wisk'acha viscacha -yuq a suffix, "the one with the viscachas", also spelled Viscachayoc) is a mountain in the Andes of Peru which reaches a height of approximately  . It is located in the Huancavelica Region, Churcampa Province, Chinchihuasi District.

References

Mountains of Peru
Mountains of Huancavelica Region